Dinesh Mohaniya is an Indian politician belonging to Aam Aadmi Party (AAP). He is an MLA from Sangam Vihar constituency. He defeated the BJP candidate Shiv Charan Lal Gupta and Congress candidate Jag Parvesh (Sajjan Kumar's son) in the 2013 Delhi Legislative Assembly election.

In 2014, Mohaniya alleged that the BJP leader Sher Singh Dagar offered him  40,000,000 to help BJP form the state government in Delhi. AAP released sting footage of the conversation between the two.

He again won Delhi Assembly Election 2020 from Sangam Vihar, with a margin of 42522 votes by defeating Shiv Charan Lal Gupta (Janata Dal (United)).

Political career 
Between Feb. 2015 and Aug. 2015 he was the Chairman, DDC South.  
Between 2015 and 2020 he was the Vice Chairman, Delhi Jal Board (DJB). From Nov. 2020 till present he served as the Chairperson, Delhi Development Committee, South East District.

Since 2020 he was the Aam Aadmi Party Incharge, Uttarakhand.  Since 2020 he was the co-Incharge MCD.

Member of Legislative Assembly

Second term (2015-2020) 
In 2015 he was elected as the MLA representing Sangam Vihar in the Sixth Legislative Assembly of Delhi. 

Committee assignments of Sixth Delhi Legislative Assembly 
Chairman, (2015-2020) The Estimates Committee

Third term (2020-)  
He was re-elected to the Delhi Legislative Assembly in 2020.
Committee assignments of Seventh Delhi Legislative Assembly 
Chairman, (2020- )  Committee on Government Undertakings

Electoral performance

References

External links 

 Dinesh Mohaniya on Twitter
 Delhi Assembly MLA Profile
 Aap Aadmi Party

1977 births
Living people
Aam Aadmi Party politicians from Delhi
Delhi MLAs 2013–2015
Delhi MLAs 2015–2020
Delhi MLAs 2020–2025